The Rocks of Valpre is a 1919 British silent film directed by Maurice Elvey and starring Basil Gill, Peggy Carlisle and Cowley Wright. It is an adaptation of the 1913 novel The Rocks of Valpré by Ethel M. Dell.

Cast
 Basil Gill as Trevor Mordaunt
 Peggy Carlisle as Christine Wyndham
 Cowley Wright as Bertrand de Montville
 Humberston Wright as Captain Rodolphe
 Barry Bernard as Noel Wyndham
 Hugh Dabernon-Stoke as Rupert Wyndham
 William Saville as Jack Forrest
 Winifred Sadler as Aunt

References

External links

1910s historical drama films
British historical drama films
British silent feature films
Films directed by Maurice Elvey
British black-and-white films
Films based on works by Ethel M. Dell
Films based on British novels
1919 drama films
1910s British films
Silent drama films